The Wales women's cricket team is the Welsh team for women's cricket. They play their home matches at various grounds across the country, including Spytty Park, Newport and Pontarddulais Park, Pontarddulais. They are captained by Lauren Parfitt.

As in men's cricket, Wales does not normally compete as a separate country internationally, instead being represented as part of the England team, but in 2005 they played in the European Championship tournament as it was being held in Wales. They finished in third place in the tournament.

The team regularly participate in the English domestic county structure, and in 2019 they competed in Division Two of the final season of the Women's County Championship. They now compete in the Women's Twenty20 Cup. They are partnered with the regional side Western Storm.

History
Wales Women's first recorded match was in 2002, against Scotland, which they won by 7 wickets. In 2004, Wales joined the English domestic county structure, competing in the County Challenge Cup: they finished 3rd in their group in their first season.

Between 2008 and 2010, Wales went through an extremely successful era in the Women's County Championship, gaining three promotions in a row, from Division 5M, Division 4 and Division 3. Ever since, Wales have played in Division 2 of the Championship, with their best finish of 3rd coming in 2018. Since 2009, Wales have also competed in the Women's Twenty20 Cup. In 2018, they gained promotion from Division Two, finishing second with 7 wins from 8 games. Overseas player Rachel Priest was key to their success, ending the season as the second leading run-scorer in the tournament, with teammate Gabrielle Basketter just behind her in third. In 2019, their first season in Division 1, Wales finished 7th. The following Twenty20 Cup season, in 2021, they finished 4th in the West Midlands Group with one victory, against eventual group winners Somerset. They finished third in their group in the 2022 Women's Twenty20 Cup. They also competed in the West Midlands Regional Cup in 2022, coming second in the initial group stage before beating Worcestershire in the final to win the inaugural edition of the competition.

Wales do not usually compete internationally, instead playing as a combined team with England. However, in 2005 they competed in the Women's European Championship, which was held in Wales. They won two matches, against Ireland and Scotland, and placed 3rd out of 5 in the final table.

Players

Current squad
Based on appearances in the 2022 season.

Seasons

Women's County Championship

Women's European Championship

Women's Twenty20 Cup

See also
 Wales national cricket team
 Western Storm

References

Women's national cricket teams
Women
Women's cricket in Wales
C